Francesco Gabrielli (1588–1636) was an Italian actor of the commedia dell'arte. He was particularly famous as a virtuoso musician, who was an accomplished player of a dozen musical instruments. He is sometimes credited with the creation of Scapino, a musical zanni (servant) role, which he may actually have taken from Niccolò Barbieri. Gabrielli first appears as a member of the troupe of the Accesi in 1612, is later recorded as a member of the Confidenti, and in 1624 was with the Fedeli in Paris (under the direction of Giovan Battista Andreini), before rejoining the Accesi.

In 1627 Gabrielli learned that the Duke of Mantua was seeking a company of actors and wrote a letter from Ferrara to Antonio Costantini, the Duke's assistant, offering to bring his family and fellow players to perform in Mantua. The letter reveals much concerning the difficulties of forming a balanced ensemble and the professional rivalries among actors, both within and between troupes.

Francesco Gabrielli was the son of the well known commedia dell'arte actor Giovanni Gabrielli (known as Sivello). Francesco married Spinetta Locatelli, an actress who appeared with him, and they had several children who became actors, including Giulia (seen in Paris as Diana in 1645). It is uncertain whether Girolamo Gabrielli (a famous Pantalone) and Ippolita Gabrielli (a troupe manager in 1663) were his children.

Notes

Bibliography
 Bergquist, Stephen A. (2014). "Scapino: A Portrait of Francesco Gabrielli", Music in Art: International Journal for Music Iconography, vol. 39,  nos. 1–2, pp. 98–101. .
 Hartnoll, Phyllis, editor (1983). The Oxford Companion to the Theatre (fourth edition). Oxford: Oxford University Press. .
 Katritzky, M. A. (2006). The Art of Commedia: A Study in the Commedia dell'Arte 1560-1620 with Special Reference to the Visual Records. Amsterdam; New York: Rodopi. .
 Lea, Kathleen Marguerite  (1934; reissued 1962).  Italian popular comedy: a study in the Commedia dell'Arte, 1560-1620, with special reference to the English stage, 2 volumes, paged continuously.  Oxford: Clarendon Press (1934), . New York: Russell & Russell (1962), .
 Rasi, Luigi (1897–1905). I Comici Italiani: Biografia, bibliografia, iconografia, 3 volumes. Florence: Fratelli Boca. Catalog record at HathiTrust.
 Richards, Kenneth; Richards, Laura (1990). The Commedia Dell'Arte: A Documentary History. Oxford: Basil Blackwell. .
 Senelick, Laurence (1995). "Gabrielli family", p. 407 in The Cambridge Guide to the Theatre, new edition, edited by Martin Banham. Cambridge: Cambridge University Press. .

Commedia dell'arte
1588 births
1636 deaths
17th-century Italian male actors